Darqad District is a district of Takhar Province, Afghanistan. The district has 34 villages. Darqad did not change between the 325 and 398 district sets. Near the end of 2018, the district was considered to be Taliban-influenced, as opposed to the Afghan government. The district was Taliban-controlled by August 2021.

Geography
Darqad has an area of 393 square kilometers, comparatively equivalent to the Isle of Wight. The district lies within the watershed of the  Ab-i Rustaq River, a tributary of the Panj River. Darqad has 34 villages.

The district is bordered by Yangi Qala to the east, Khwaja Bahauddin to the southeast, Dashti Qala to the south, and Khatlon to the west and to the north. Khatlon is a Tajik province, with all other entities being districts in Takhar province. The Panj river separates Darqad from Tajikistan.

Demographics
Darqad has a population of 25152, with a sex ratio of 26 males to 25 females. The median age is 14.9. 45.8% of the district's population is working, and of those that don't work, half of them are seeking work. The average household size is 6.7 people, meaning there are about 3,754 households in Darqad.

Economy
There are some basic roads in the district, but there is a lack of a coordinated transportation system.  Darqad has some natural mines and forests.  There is some agricultural activity in the district, however the land sometimes is flooded by the Panj. There is a lack of improved seeds, fertilizer, and trained farmers.

There are valuable smuggling routes between Darqad and Tajikistan.

Education and Healthcare
Darqad has some schools, with a few of them being religious schools. However, there is administrative corruption, a lack of funds, lack of equipment, lack of land, and lack of drinking water. Half of the population ages 15–24 can read.

The district has some basic health centers, with doctors and vaccination. Darqad lacks professional doctors, equipment, technology, and a hospital.

References

Districts of Takhar Province